"Vulnerable" is a song by American singer Selena Gomez from her third studio album, Rare (2020), included as the sixth track on the standard version album, and on the deluxe version the eighth track. The track was written by Gomez, Amy Allen, Jordan Johnson, Stefan Johnson, and Jonathan Bellion, with the latter handling production alongside the Monsters & Strangerz.

The song received acclaim from music critics, who praised Gomez's vocals and the songwriting.

Composition
Musically, "Vulnerable" is a disco, electropop, and synth-pop song with elements of Italo disco and tropical house genres. The song features a "moody synth groove", a "chugging rhythm", and vocoded vocals with a "ghostly edge". In terms of music notation, "Vulnerable" was composed using  common time in the key of G minor, with a tempo of 100 beats per minute. Gomez's vocal range spans from the low note of F3 to the high note of D5, giving the song one octave and four tones of range. Lyrically, it finds Gomez struggling to let someone in, through the chorus "if I show you all my demons/and we dive into the deep end/would we crash and burn like every time before?", wondering whether they could handle her, if she showed her vulnerabilities to them. Gomez has also stated that the song is one of her favorites off the album.

Critical reception
"Vulnerable" received acclaim from music critics. Quinn Moreland of Pitchfork called the song Gomez's "best performance" stating that she "sounds firm and assured even when she dips into a whisper." Idolator highlighted the song as a "delight" from Rare. Mike Wass from the website wrote that "Vulnerable" ranks "as one of best synth-pop offerings of 2020", calling it as "frighteningly addictive" as "musical heroin". Furthermore, the site ranked the song at number 6 on “The 100 Best Pop Songs of 2020” list.

Credits and personnel
Credits adapted from the liner notes of Rare.

Recording locations
 Recorded at Interscope Studios (Santa Monica, California)
 Mixed at MixStar Studios (Virginia Beach, Virginia)
 Mastered at Sterling Sound (Edgewater, New Jersey)

Personnel

 Selena Gomez – lead vocals, songwriting
 The Monsters & Strangerz – production, instrumentation
 Jon Bellion – production, songwriting, instrumentation, backing vocals
 Amy Allen – songwriting, backing vocals
 Jordan Johnson – songwriting
 Stefan Johnson – songwriting, engineering
 Bart Schoudel – vocal production, engineering
 Gian Stone – additional vocal production
 Andrew Boyd – assisting
 John Hanes – engineering
 Serban Ghenea – mixing
 Chris Gehringer – mastering
 Will Quinnell – mastering

Charts

Release history

References

2020 songs
Selena Gomez songs
Song recordings produced by the Monsters & Strangerz
Songs written by Selena Gomez
Songs written by Jon Bellion
Songs written by Jordan Johnson (songwriter)
Songs written by Stefan Johnson
Songs written by Amy Allen (songwriter)